Rachael Stewart  (born 1973) is a Scottish singer and folk dancer. She is one of the founding members of electro-pop group Beauty School and first came to attention in 1997 when she toured with electronic music group Fluke.

Life and career
Around 1997, with the release of Risotto, Fluke adopted a character from the Wipeout computer game, Arial Tetsuo, as their official mascot. Also around this time, the group was looking for a female vocalist to perform with them in their live sets, and Stewart fit both these roles. She is described as a "female version of Keith Flint from The Prodigy". With Fluke's performances in decline, she joined forces with EMF frontman James Atkin, whom she later married, to form Beauty School in 2004. In 2005, Beauty School was joined by Elastica drummer Justin Welch making the band into a three piece.

Notes and references

1973 births
Living people
21st-century Scottish women singers
Fluke (band) members